Trey Diller (born March 12, 1990) is a former American football wide receiver. He played college football at Sam Houston State University, and signed with the Carolina Panthers as an undrafted free agent in 2013.

High School career
Diller attended The Woodlands College Park High School in The Woodlands, Texas. He caught 59 passes for 1,460 yards and 22 touchdowns, and helped lead the College Park Cavaliers to an undefeated regular season as a senior. He also returned two kickoffs and three punts for touchdowns.

College career
Diller originally played at Wofford College, where he contributed to special teams. He made 5 tackles and also returned a kick off for a touchdown.

Entering his sophomore season, Diller transferred from Wofford to Sam Houston State University in Hunstville, Texas, only a few miles north from where he went to high school. In his career, Diller caught 2,117 yards for 11 touchdowns at Sam Houston State, leading his team to two back-to-back FCS national championship appearances. He also returned two punts for touchdowns.

Professional career

Diller was ranked 1st in FCS receivers, 3rd overall in FCS athletes, and 82nd in overall NCAA players. He was predicted to be an early 7th round draft pick.

Carolina Panthers
After going undrafted, Diller signed with the Carolina Panthers on April 26, 2013. He caught 2 passes for 19 yards in the preseason, additionally returning 2 punts for a combined 41 yards, and making 2 tackles. Diller was cut from the team after being placed on injury reserve.

New Orleans Voodoo
After briefly practicing with the Los Angeles Kiss, Diller signed with the New Orleans VooDoo of the Arena Football League on March 5, 2015. He was released by the team before the season due to a reoccurring knee injury. He shortly after retired from football.

Personal life
Trey Diller retired from professional football after reoccurring injuries began affecting his personal life. He briefly coached at Sam Houston State but currently owns his own business, Inspire Productions.

On July 17, 2017, Diller was severely injured in a car accident near Luling, Texas in which his truck rear-ended a semi-truck trailer at high speeds. He was hospitalized for several months, while driver, friend, and Army veteran Justin Hartley was fatally injured.

References

1990 births
Living people
American football wide receivers
Carolina Panthers players
New Orleans VooDoo players
Sam Houston Bearkats football players
Sam Houston State University alumni